KLYV (105.3 FM) is a radio station broadcasting a Top 40 (CHR) format branded as Y105, serving the Dubuque, Iowa, United States, area.  The station is owned by Townsquare Media and licensed to Townsquare License, LLC.

The station has been a "typical" Top 40 station since 1982, and a CHR station since 1986. The station first went under the formats of MOR in the 1970s, and Beautiful Music beginning in 1980. The station dropped the beautiful music format in 1982 for an AOR-leaning Top 40 format, and its KIWI call letters changed to KLYV. Its AOR-lean dropped in 1986 when more contemporary titles were added.

On August 30, 2013, a deal was announced in which Cumulus Media would swap its stations in Dubuque (including KLYV) and Poughkeepsie, New York to Townsquare Media in exchange for Peak Broadcasting's Fresno, California stations. The deal was part of Cumulus' acquisition of Dial Global; Townsquare, Peak, and Dial Global were all controlled by Oaktree Capital Management. The sale to Townsquare was completed on November 14, 2013. As of March 2022, the flagship program is the morning show, hosted by Steve Pulaski, which airs from 6 - 10 am weekdays.

References

External links
Y105 Official Website

LYV
Contemporary hit radio stations in the United States
Townsquare Media radio stations